John Hunner (November 12, 1844 – May 19, 1918) was an American politician.

Born in Buffalo, New York, he moved to Alma, Wisconsin, in 1860, where he was editor of the local paper and became the first president of the village of Alma. After the Civil War, Hunner moved to Eau Claire, Wisconsin, where he was a grocer and became the editor of the local paper in 1871. He was elected city clerk of Eau Claire. In 1890, Hunner was elected mayor of Eau Claire. He served as State Treasurer of Wisconsin from 1891 to 1895 and was a member of the Democratic Party. He moved to Baltimore in 1917 after suffering a stroke, where he died two years later. His remains were returned to Wisconsin and he was buried at Lakeview Cemetery in Eau Claire.

Notes

Politicians from Buffalo, New York
People from Alma, Wisconsin
State treasurers of Wisconsin
Wisconsin Democrats
Editors of Wisconsin newspapers
Businesspeople from Wisconsin
1844 births
1918 deaths
Mayors of Eau Claire, Wisconsin
19th-century American politicians
19th-century American businesspeople
Journalists from New York (state)